Yip Hon Weng (born 1977) is a Singaporean politician, former civil servant and teacher. A member of the governing People's Action Party (PAP), he has been the Member of Parliament (MP) representing Yio Chu Kang SMC since 2020.

Education
Yip graduated from Loughborough University with a bachelor's degree with first class honours in physical education, sports science and mathematics under an overseas scholarship conferred by the Public Service Commission (PSC). 

He completed his training as a teacher and obtained a PGCE from the University of Exeter. 

He subsequently went on to complete master's degrees in; administration, planning & social policy and international education with double concentrations at Harvard University; knowledge engineering at the National University of Singapore; and financial engineering at the Nanyang Technological University with a project stint at Carnegie Mellon University. 

Yip is also a Sloan Fellow and has completed a Master of Business Administration degree at the Massachusetts Institute of Technology under the Administrative Service Postgraduate Scholarship conferred by the Singapore Government.

Career

Early career
Yip started his career as a physical education and mathematics teacher at Kent Ridge Secondary School. 

He subsequently served in several leadership, management and policy related roles in the Ministry of Education (MOE), Minister of Manpower (MOM), Ministry of Defence (MINDEF), Ministry of Health (MOH) and the Ministry of National Development (MND). 

He was also part of the founding team that established the Municipal Services Office announced during the 2014 National Day Rally Speech, when the OneService app was created. He was Group Chief of the Silver Generation Office in the Agency of Integrated Care and concurrently Advisor (Care Integration) under the Ministry of Health prior to entering politics.

Politics
Yip was fielded in the 2020 general election as a solo PAP candidate contesting in Yio Chu Kang SMC against the Progress Singapore Party. 

On 11 July 2020, Yip was declared an elected Member of Parliament (MP) representing Yio Chu Kang SMC in the 14th Parliament after garnering 61% of the vote.

Personal life
Yip is married and has five children.

References

External links
 Yip Hon Weng on Parliament of Singapore

National University of Singapore alumni
Nanyang Technological University alumni
MIT Sloan School of Management alumni
Harvard Graduate School of Education alumni
People's Action Party politicians
1977 births
Living people
Members of the Parliament of Singapore